Saddle Pals is an album by the Western swing band Riders in the Sky, released in 1985. It is directed toward a children's audience.

Track listing
 "Yippie-Yi-Yo and Away We Go" (Paul Chrisman) – 2:11
 "The Old Chisholm Trail" (Traditional) – 2:34
 "Get Along Little Dogies" (Traditional) – 1:57
 "Biscuit Blues" (Bob Nolan) – 3:25
 "Sweet Betsy from Pike" (Traditional) – 2:27
 "There's a Great Big Candy Roundup" (Estella, Manning, Robino) – 2:06
 "I'm Going to Leave Old Texas Now" (Traditional) – 3:08
 "The Cowboy's ABCs" (Douglas B. Green) – 2:57
 "Clementine" (Traditional) – 2:45
 "One, Two, Three, Said the Miner" (Green) – 2:14
 "Fiddle Medley" (Traditional) – 2:44
 "Down the Lullabye Trail" (Green) – 3:06

Personnel
Douglas B. Green (a.k.a. Ranger Doug) – guitar, vocals
Paul Chrisman (a.k.a. Woody Paul) – fiddle, vocals
Fred LaBour (a.k.a. Too Slim) – bass, vocals

External links
Riders in the Sky Official Website

1985 albums
Riders in the Sky (band) albums
Rounder Records albums